Alexandre Hammer (born 26 May 1996) is a French badminton player. In 2015, he won bronze medal at the European Junior Championships in mixed doubles event with his partner Anne Tran.

Achievements

European Junior Championships 
Mixed doubles

BWF International Challenge/Series
Men's doubles

Mixed doubles

 BWF International Challenge tournament
 BWF International Series tournament
 BWF Future Series tournament

References

External links 

1996 births
Living people
French male badminton players
21st-century French people